Asclepias viridula, commonly known as southern milkweed, is a species of milkweed (Asclepias) genus in the Apocynaceae family. It is a perennial found in Florida, Georgia, and Alabama. It grows in the Florida panhandle. Its flowers are white or green.

References

viridula
Perennial plants
Flora of Alabama
Flora of Florida
Flora of Georgia (U.S. state)
Plants described in 1860
Taxa named by Alvan Wentworth Chapman